Gurgen or Gourgen (Armenian: Գուրգեն, Georgian: გურგენ) is an Armenian and Georgian masculine name of Middle Persian origin (Gurgēn), itself ultimately deriving from Old Iranian Vṛkaina-. It may refer to:

Georgian monarchs
Gurgen of Iberia
Gurgen I of Tao
Gurgen II of Tao

Other people
Gurgen Margaryan
Gurgen Dalibaltayan
Gurgen Askaryan
Gurgen Mahari
Gurgen Boryan

 Gourgen Yanikian
 Gourgen Edilyan
 Gourgen Paronyan

Places
Gürgan, Azerbaijan

Armenian masculine given names
Georgian masculine given names
Persian masculine given names